Sidi Yahia is a village in the Boumerdès Province in Kabylie, Algeria.

Location
The village is surrounded by Meraldene River and Boumerdès River and the towns of Thénia and Tidjelabine in the Khachna mountain range.

Notable people

References

Villages in Algeria
Boumerdès Province
Kabylie